"Silence Please" is a science fiction short story by British writer Arthur C. Clarke, first published in 1950. The piece was later used as the introductory story for Clarke's collection Tales from the White Hart.

This comic story describes the efforts of a brilliant college student to design a machine that would produce a field of absolute silence. The gadget is then used in a prank, with tragic results. The story touches (albeit in a humorous way) on the popular science fiction theme of an inventor coming to grief at the hands of their invention that is best known from Mary Shelley's novel Frankenstein. The piece also references the composer "Edward England", an obvious parody of the work of Benjamin Britten.

The "Fenton Silencer" described in the story uses the same phase-inversion principle found in modern noise-canceling headphones.

The story was one of two works by Clarke translated by Hungarian writer and politician Árpád Göncz: the other was 2001: A Space Odyssey.

References

External links 
 

Short stories by Arthur C. Clarke
1950 short stories
Tales from the White Hart